Turkish Aeronautical Association is a non-profit organization with an aim of increasing public awareness and participation in aviation related activities and the national body governing air sports in Turkey. The association was founded with the name Türk Tayyare Cemiyeti (Turkish Aeroplane League) by the directive of Mustafa Kemal Atatürk on February 16, 1925.

During the 1940s, it operated a factory in Ankara producing aircraft of its own design as well as under licence from British manufacturer Miles. These manufacturing facilities were purchased in 1952 by MKEK, which produced the THK-15 design in quantity under the designation MKEK-4.

THK is a member of Fédération Aéronautique Internationale (FAI) since 1929, and has been an active participant in international air sports events and championships, including the organization of the 1st World Air Games hosted by THK in 1997.

Training centers

Türkkuşu Training Center
Türkkuşu Training Center in Ankara also serves as the headquarters of THK. Throughout years, Türkkuşu trained many talented aviators including Sabiha Gökçen the first female Turkish aviator.

The center offers courses on:
 Piloting
 Parachuting
 Gliding
 Construction and running of model aircraft

İnönü Training Center
Located in İnönü, Eskişehir, the center runs summer courses on the following air sports activities:
 Parachuting
 Gliding
 Ballooning
 Paragliding
 Hang gliding

Selçuk (Ephesus) Training Center
This center in Selçuk, İzmir offers courses in:
 Piloting
 Gliding
 Parachuting
Microlight training

The center also participates in aerial firefighting and agricultural chemical spraying operations in the region.

Aircraft

 THK-01 - WĘDRYCHOWSKI, Jerzy & DULĘBA, Leszek & ROGALSKI, Stanisław & TEISSEYRE, Jerzy - Türk Hava Kurumu
 THK-2
 THK-03 - JACOBS, Hans & DFS - (DFS Habicht)
 THK-04 - USSR- Türk Hava Kurumu (АНТОНОВ УС-4 (Antonov US-4))
 THK-5
 THK-5A
 THK-07 - Antonov, Oleg Konstantinovich & SSBC - Türk Hava Kurumu (Antonov PS-2)
 THK-09 - SCHAWROW, W. B. & SSCB - Türk Hava Kurumu
 THK-10
 THK-11
 THK-12
 THK-13
 THK-14
 THK-15
 THK-16 Mehmetçik (Turkish: "Little Mehmet")
 THK-TAYSU (Abbreviations in Turkish: Tarimsal Havacilik ve Yangin Söndürme Uçagi) Agricultural Aviation and Fire Fighting Aircraft

See also

 Tayyare Apartments, redeveloped into five-star hotel in Istanbul

Notes

References

External links
 Official website of THK (Turkish, English, and French)
 UÇANTÜRK, bimonthly journal of aeronautics and space published by THK

Air sports
Parachuting organizations
Aircraft manufacturers of Turkey
Aviation organizations based in Turkey
Air sports
Sports organizations established in 1925
Organizations based in Ankara
Non-profit organizations based in Turkey
1925 establishments in Turkey